The Adventures of Stevie V was a British dance music act from Biggleswade, Bedfordshire, England. In the late 1980s and early 1990s, it scored several hits on the UK Singles Chart and the US Hot Dance Music/Club Play chart, most notably with the song "Dirty Cash (Money Talks)".

History
Assembled by producer Steve Vincent (formerly of Brit-funk band Touchdown), the group consisted of Vincent, Mick Walsh and singer Melody Washington. Their most successful single was "Dirty Cash (Money Talks)", a 1990 dance hit that crossed over to pop radio and hit No. 2 on the UK Singles Chart, as well as peaking at No. 25 on the US Billboard Hot 100 in 1990. An album, Adventures of Stevie V followed, with a further two singles reaching the charts – "Body Language" reaching the UK Top 40, and "Jealousy" reaching both the UK and US charts.

Vincent released a second album, Satisfy Me in 1993, which featured a host of different singers, including soul divas Thelma Houston, Gwen Guthrie, Ruby Turner and Beverlei Brown. The singles "Push 2 the Limit" and "Paradise" did not chart.

After the demise of The Adventures of Stevie V, Walsh went on to have a US dance hit with "Set Me Free" by Clubland, having moved to New York City. Vincent meanwhile would go on to teach music technology at Bedford College, Bedford.

Discography

Albums

Singles

See also
List of Number 1 Dance Hits (United States)
List of artists who reached number one on the US Dance chart

References

English electronic music duos
English dance music groups
Musical groups from Bedfordshire